Jerome Caja (1958-1995) was an American mixed-media painter and Queercore performance artist in San Francisco, California in the 1980s and early 1990s.

Early life and education
Jerome Caja was born on January 20, 1958, in Cleveland, Ohio. Raised in a strict Catholic family, Caja was one of 11 sons. He referred to his family as a family full of jocks, although he himself was a frail sickly child. Caja having been raised in a strict Catholic household was early on heavily influenced by the imagery of saints and martyrs. Caja graduated from St. Edward High School, an all-boys Catholic school, where he suffered poor grades due to dyslexia. Caja began his college education at Cuyahoga Community College and later attended Cleveland State University, where he earned a Bachelor of Fine Arts degree in 1984. He then moved to San Francisco to attend the San Francisco Art Institute and graduated with a Master of Fine Arts degree in 1986.

Career
In the late 1980s, Caja became a well-known artistic personality within the radical gay scene in San Francisco. Caja performed as a drag queen and go-go dancer in San Francisco's queer punk nightclubs, where his performance art has been described as "post-apocalyptic deconstructive drag." In one Easter performance at Club Uranus, Caja in drag performed an elaborate reenactment of the crucifixion and resurrection of Jesus.

Caja began by producing ceramic sculptures and then he moved on to create paintings. Caja crafted miniature mixed-media artworks which he created from everyday materials, especially those used by drag queens such as nail polish, sequins, lace and glitter. Caja was a fan of makeup even before he was diagnosed with AIDS, so he transferred his own affection for makeup straight into his artistic work. Many of Caja's works were influenced by Catholic iconography and satirized Christian morality. Professor of Communication Fred Turner described Caja's paintings as "fragments of a private allegory – often dizzyingly grotesque, but also glorious, gentle and sad." While in his other artwork, he tried to express his own fearlessness.

Death
According to Caja, he tested positive for HIV around 1989 and began to show symptoms of sickness around 1992. Caja as well suffered from CMV retinitis as result of the diagnosis. In August and September 1995, the Archives of American Art recorded an oral history interview with Caja. He died of AIDS in San Francisco on November 3, 1995. His memorial service was held at the Hole in the Wall gay bar in South of Market, San Francisco.

Artworks
Caja's art is located in the New York Public Library and the Los Angeles County Museum. The San Francisco Museum of Modern Art (SFMOMA) twice provided exhibits of paintings by Caja. Before his death, Caja gifted his unsold artworks to the SFMOMA. Caja's personal papers and effects are archived in the Smithsonian Institution. In addition to the locations mentioned above, The Jerome Project, was created to bring greater visibility and accessibility to Caja's artwork. The Jerome Project is a non profit organization, that was created by Anthony Cianciolo in order to preserve and protect the artistic legacy of Caja. The Jerome Projects' goal is to bring recognition to Caja as an important 20th century artist and not simply as a marginalized, controversial, gay artist.

References

Further reading

External links
The Jerome Project—a non-profit organization dedicated to the artistic works of Jerome Caja
Art by Jerome Caja—at Visual AIDS organization

1958 births
1995 deaths
American LGBT artists
American drag queens
LGBT people from Ohio
LGBT people from California
American performance artists
Artists from Cleveland
Artists from San Francisco
American contemporary artists
AIDS-related deaths in California
Mixed-media artists
San Francisco Art Institute alumni
20th-century American LGBT people